Shurtan Stadium, also known as Sho'rtan Stadion is the official home of FC Shurtan Guzar.

References

Football venues in Uzbekistan
Athletics (track and field) venues in Uzbekistan
Sports venues in Uzbekistan
Multi-purpose stadiums in Uzbekistan